Park Byeong-ju (Hanja: 朴炳柱; born 24 March 1985) is a South Korean retired footballer who played as a defender.

Club career
Park drafted by Seongnam Ilhwa Chunma in 2008, after one of his less successful spells at Seongnam he joined National League side Suwon City FC in 2009. During two seasons, he appeared in 42 matches and scored 2 goals.

On 3 November 2011, Park was transferred to the newly founded Gwangju FC.

On 9 January 2012, Park left Gwangju for the K League rivals Jeju United, along with then teammate Heo Jae-won and then back to Gwangju in 2013, where he retired in 2014.

References

External links 

1985 births
Living people
South Korean footballers
Seongnam FC players
Suwon FC players
Gwangju FC players
Jeju United FC players
K League 1 players
K League 2 players
Korea National League players
Dankook University alumni
Sportspeople from North Gyeongsang Province
Association football defenders